In the mathematical field of set theory, Martin's axiom, introduced by Donald A. Martin and Robert M. Solovay, is a statement that is independent of the usual axioms of ZFC set theory. It is implied by the continuum hypothesis, but it is consistent with ZFC and the negation of the continuum hypothesis. Informally, it says that all cardinals less than the cardinality of the continuum, behave roughly like . The intuition behind this can be understood by studying the proof of the Rasiowa–Sikorski lemma. It is a principle that is used to control certain forcing arguments.

Statement

For any cardinal 𝛋, we define a statement, denoted by MA(𝛋):

For any partial order P satisfying the countable chain condition (hereafter ccc) and any family D of dense sets in P such that |D| ≤ 𝛋, there is a filter F on P such that F ∩ d is non-empty for every d in D.

 is simply true — this is known as the Rasiowa–Sikorski lemma.  is false: [0, 1] is a compact Hausdorff space, which is separable and so ccc. It has no isolated points, so points in it are nowhere dense, but it is the union of  many points. Since it is a theorem of ZFC that  fails, Martin's axiom is stated as:

Martin's axiom (MA): For every 𝛋 < , MA(𝛋) holds.

In this case (for application of ccc), an antichain is a subset A of P such that any two distinct members of A are incompatible (two elements are said to be compatible if there exists a common element below both of them in the partial order). This differs from, for example, the notion of antichain in the context of trees.

Equivalent forms of MA(𝛋)

The following statements are equivalent to MA(𝛋):
 If X is a compact Hausdorff topological space that satisfies the ccc then X is not the union of 𝛋 or fewer nowhere dense subsets.
 If P is a non-empty upwards ccc poset and Y is a family of cofinal subsets of P with |Y| ≤ 𝛋 then there is an upwards-directed set A such that A meets every element of Y.
 Let A be a non-zero ccc Boolean algebra and F a family of subsets of A with |F| ≤ 𝛋. Then there is a boolean homomorphism φ: A → Z/2Z such that for every X in F either there is an a in X with φ(a) = 1 or there is an upper bound b for X with φ(b) = 0.

Consequences

Martin's axiom has a number of other interesting combinatorial, analytic and topological consequences:

 The union of 𝛋 or fewer null sets in an atomless σ-finite Borel measure on a Polish space is null. In particular, the union of 𝛋 or fewer subsets of R of Lebesgue measure 0 also has Lebesgue measure 0.
 A compact Hausdorff space X with |X| < 2𝛋 is  sequentially compact, i.e., every sequence has a convergent subsequence.
 No non-principal ultrafilter on N has a base of cardinality < 𝛋.
 Equivalently for any x in βN\N we have 𝜒(x) ≥ 𝛋, where 𝜒 is the character of x, and so 𝜒(βN) ≥ 𝛋.
  implies that a product of ccc topological spaces is ccc (this in turn implies there are no Suslin lines).
 MA + ¬CH implies that there exists a Whitehead group that is not free; Shelah used this to show that the Whitehead problem is independent of ZFC.

Further development

Martin's axiom has generalizations called the proper forcing axiom and Martin's maximum.
Sheldon W. Davis has suggested in his book that Martin's axiom is motivated by the Baire category theorem.

References

Further reading

 
 Jech, Thomas, 2003. Set Theory: The Third Millennium Edition, Revised and Expanded.  Springer.  .
 Kunen, Kenneth, 1980. Set Theory: An Introduction to Independence Proofs. Elsevier.  .

Axioms of set theory
Independence results
Set theory